Charles Marcon may refer to

Charles Abdy Marcon (1853–1953), English clergyman
Sholto Marcon (Charles Sholto Wyndham Marcon, 1890–1959), schoolmaster and hockey player